Pratt Historic District is a national historic district located at Pratt, Kanawha County, West Virginia.  The district includes 67 contributing buildings and one contributing site.  The primarily residential district includes some notable commercial, ecclesiastical, civic, and industrial buildings dated as early as the 1820s. Notable buildings include the Charles Pratt Mining Company office (c. 1889), I.O.O.F. Building (c. 1922-1923), Samuel Hanna House (c. 1830-1840), Jim Shields Corner (c. 1880), James Trimble House, Weaver-Grose House (c. 1905), Burke-Mooney House, Boyer House (c. 1910), The Blue House, Perry-Holt House (c. 1896), Old Town Hall (c. 1875), The Cooperage, and Pratt Cemetery. The delisted Mother Jones Prison was once located in the district.

It was listed on the National Register of Historic Places in 1984.

References

Buildings and structures in Kanawha County, West Virginia
Historic districts in Kanawha County, West Virginia
National Register of Historic Places in Kanawha County, West Virginia
Victorian architecture in West Virginia
Historic districts on the National Register of Historic Places in West Virginia